Burapha University Hospital is a university teaching hospital, affiliated to the Faculty of Medicine of Burapha University, located in Mueang Chonburi District, Chonburi Province. It is a hospital capable of super tertiary care.

History 
The Burapha University Health Sciences Center (originally the Medical Center Project), donated by Gen. Arthit Kamlang-ek, was inaugurated on 31 August 1984. It was a two-story building, similar to other existing community hospitals, aimed to provide medical services to local citizens, with the potential of becoming a training institution. By 1985, the outpatient department had expanded, and the center was capable of 24-hour baby delivery. In 2008, following reforms in the university, the hospital operations were transferred to the faculty of Medicine.

See also 

 Health in Thailand
 Hospitals in Thailand
 List of hospitals in Thailand

References 

Teaching hospitals in Thailand
Hospitals in Thailand
Chonburi province